The Angola women's national basketball team Under-20 represented Angola in international basketball competitions and is controlled by the Federação Angolana de Basquetebol. At continental level, it competed at the FIBA Africa Under-20 Championship for Women which was eligible for the FIBA Under-21 World Championship for Women. Angola has been a member of FIBA since 1979.

Current roster
n/a

Head coach position
 n/a

FIBA Under-17 World Championship for Women record
 2007 FIBA Under-21 World Championship for Women: Not Qualified
 2005 FIBA Under-21 World Championship for Women: Not Qualified

African Championship for Women record

Past rosters 

|}
| valign="top" |
 Head coach

 Assistant coach

Legend
 (C) Team captain
 Club field describes current club
|}

|}
| valign="top" |
 Head coach

 Assistant coach

Legend
 (C) Team captain
 Club field describes current club
|}

Former managers 
 2002 Alexandre Neto
 2006 Aníbal Moreira

See also
 Angola women's national basketball team
 Angola women's national basketball team Under-18
 Angola women's national basketball team Under-16

References

External links
 2006 Team profile at FIBA.com

Women's national under-20 basketball teams
under